Shanyangosaurus (meaning "Shanyang lizard") is a genus of theropod dinosaur found in Shaanxi, China, and known only from a partial sacrum, partial scapula, humeri, femur, tibia, metatarsals, and phalanges found in the Maastrichtian aged Shanyang Formation. The bones are reportedly hollow; this, along with other features of the femur and known foot bones, suggest it is a member of the coelurosauria, but a specific family cannot be determined without more material. Holtz et al. assigned Shanyangosaurus to Avetheropoda.

References

Late Cretaceous dinosaurs of Asia
Prehistoric coelurosaurs
Fossil taxa described in 1996